Alessio Bongioni (born 24 April 1975) is an Italian racing cyclist. He rode in the 1998 Tour de France.

References

1975 births
Living people
Italian male cyclists
Place of birth missing (living people)